The 2020 Dawn Ultra 150 was the eighth stock car race of the 2020 ARCA Menards Series and the inaugural iteration of the event. The race was held on Friday, July 24, 2020, in Kansas City, Kansas at Kansas Speedway, a 1.5 miles (2.4 km) permanent D-shaped oval racetrack. The race took the scheduled 100 laps to complete. At race's end, Bret Holmes of Bret Holmes Racing would dominate to win his first and so far final career ARCA Menards Series win and his first and only win of the season. To fill out the podium, Ryan Repko of Venturini Motorsports and Riley Herbst of Joe Gibbs Racing would finish second and third, respectively.

Background 

Kansas Speedway is a 1.5-mile (2.4 km) tri-oval race track in Kansas City, Kansas. It was built in 2001 and hosts two annual NASCAR race weekends. The NTT IndyCar Series also raced there until 2011. The speedway is owned and operated by the International Speedway Corporation.

Entry list

Practice 
The only one-hour practice session would occur on Friday, July 24.

Starting lineup 
ARCA would not hold a qualifying session for the race. Therefore, the current 2020 owner's standings would be determined for who got the pole. As a result, Riley Herbst of Joe Gibbs Racing won the pole.

Race results

References 

2020 ARCA Menards Series
NASCAR races at Kansas Speedway
July 2020 sports events in the United States
2020 in sports in Kansas